Ronnie L. Valentine (born November 27, 1957) is an American former professional basketball player.

College
A 6'7" forward, Valentine attended Old Dominion University from 1976 to 1980. He set a school record with 2,204 points in his college career and scored ten points or more in 101 consecutive games. His career high for the Old Dominion Monarchs was 44 points in a game against Tulane University during his sophomore year. As a senior in 1980, he led Old Dominion to their first appearance in the NCAA Division I men's basketball tournament, where the team fell to UCLA.

Professional career
After college, Valentine was selected by the Denver Nuggets with the 51st pick of the 1980 NBA draft. He played 24 games for the Nuggets during the 1980–81 NBA season, scoring 84 points. Valentine later played in the Continental Basketball Association, the United States Basketball League, and in Italy. In 1982, he earned the CBA's MVP Award after averaging 32 points per game for the Montana Golden Nuggets. He also led the West team with 25 points in the 1982 CBA All-Star Game. After his playing career ended, Valentine lived homeless on the streets of Miami for 27 years.

Awards
Valentine was inducted into Old Dominion University's Sports Hall of Fame in 1985.

References

1957 births
Living people
American expatriate basketball people in Italy
American men's basketball players
Baltimore Lightning players
Basketball players from Norfolk, Virginia
Denver Nuggets draft picks
Denver Nuggets players
Detroit Spirits players
Montana Golden Nuggets players
Old Dominion Monarchs men's basketball players
Power forwards (basketball)
Tampa Bay Thrillers players
American expatriate basketball people in the Philippines
Tanduay Rhum Masters players
Philippine Basketball Association imports